Hamilton is a rural locality in the local government area (LGA) of Central Highlands in the Central LGA region of Tasmania. The 2016 census recorded a population of 241 for the suburb of Hamilton.

History 
Hamilton was gazetted as a locality in 1959.

Governor Lachlan Macquarie named the locality "Sorell Plains", and it became locally  known as "Macquarie" and "Lower Clyde".

Governor George Arthur finalised a name for the locality and this was announced in 1826. Hamilton was named after William Henry Hamilton, a wealthy free settler who had arrived in Van Diemen's Land in April 1824.

Hamilton Post Office opened on 1 June 1832.

Hamilton was once a bustling frontier town that contained many inns and several working breweries.

It contains a few small shops and buildings, such as the court house, many of them dating back to convict times.

Geography
The River Derwent (Meadowbank Lake) forms the south-western boundary. The Clyde River flows through from north to south after forming a small part of the northern boundary.

Road infrastructure
Route A10 (Lyell Highway) runs through from south-east to west. Route B110 (Hollow Tree Road) starts at an intersection with A10 and runs north-east until it exits. Route C182 (Thousand Acre Lane) starts at an intersection with A10 and runs east until it exits.

Notable people 
Cricketer Percy Lewis was born here in 1864. Tasmanian artist Edith Lilla Holmes was born here in 1893.

References

Further reading 
 
 Beavan, Ernest G. (1988) Take heed lest you forget: a history of St. Peter's Anglican Church, Hamilton, Tasmania. Hamilton, Tas. St. Peter's Church Vestry. 

Towns in Tasmania
Localities of Central Highlands Council